Ashwin Srivastava is an Indian venture capitalist who is the cofounder and member of the Board of Idein Ventures (founded Idein ventures in 2015.), a growth-stage private equity accelerator with operations in India, UAE and Africa. He has been an entrepreneur since 2010. He is also the co-founder of Great Manager Institute  and CEO of Sapio Analytics.

Ashwin was part of the Forbes 30 Under 30 Asia 2017 list under the Finance & Venture Capital category.

He is Regional Mentor of Change at NITI Aayog and Advisor at Technology Coordination Committee, Indian Council of Medical Research.

Ashwin is also the co-founder of Ajantahc, an Indian culture media platform jointly created with Vedan Choolun, Chairman of Uitv, and has founded a virtual cancer hospital and Cancer Rounds.

Early life and education
Ashwin has completed his Bachelor of Technology and Master of Technology from Indian Institute of Technology Bombay. He holds a degree in Mechanical Engineering. In college, he took part in theatre and robotics. He was a member of hostel council, and manager of The Entrepreneurship Cell, IIT Bombay.

Entrepreneurship
Ashwin and Hariom Sharma started Incept, a biometric equipment manufacturer in August 2010. Its head office was set up in Goregaon, Mumbai.

In 2012, Ashwin was listed as one of the top 100 entrepreneurs in 2011 by Small and Medium Entrepreneur Magazine.

From 2011 to 2013, Incept partnered with clients and customers such as Indian Institute of Technology Bombay and Nigeria Identity Management Commission. In September 2013, Incept merged with Solus, another player in the biometric industry, in an undisclosed shares and cash deal. At Incept, Ashwin also led the Incept Training Academy and was a guest lecturer there.

Ashwin led FindURClass and Plancess, in consulting capacity. He is also a Director at Core Grocer.

He is a director of Princeton Healthcare since November 2020.

Venture capital
Ashwin is currently the Director of Qriyo, Propcare, Restate Solutions, and Infurnia. In August 2022, Infurnia Holdings filed draft red herring prospectus for its initial public offering. 

Outside India, he has interests in investments in GCC countries and countries in Africa. Ashwin has been involved in investing in Sumant Kumar, a farmer from Bihar known for System of Rice Intensification. Idein Ventures also seed-funded UAE based ZoEasy Solutions, which uses disruptive technology to connect businesses and consumers with their ideal blue collar workforce.

Inventions 
Ashwin is a considered a proponent of human-centred artificial intelligence, and his works have featured in a podcast by Microsoft India titled Paradigm Shift, featuring stories of innovations. A patent titled "Process for identifying suspect entities via network depth using document analytics" published by Sapio Analytics attributes him and Rai Aman Narain as inventors.

Other notable incidents 
In May 2013, Ashwin was victim of an accident that made him an amputee. He participated in a marathon in Mumbai soon after the accident. He floated a petition to change the heights of platforms in Mumbai suburban train stations, that ended in victory.

In 2014, Ashwin became a member of the political organization Aam Aadmi Party and a national convenor of Entrepreneurs for AAP. It is unclear if he is still a member. He is a mentor for startups and small businesses.

References

Indian venture capitalists
Indian amputees
Year of birth missing (living people)
Living people
IIT Bombay alumni